is the 8th album by the Japanese girl idol group Berryz Kobo, released on February 22, 2012 in Japan on the record label Piccolo Town.

As usual, it is entirely written and produced by Tsunku.

The album contains the title tracks from three previously released hit singles: "Ai no Dangan", "Aa, Yo ga Akeru", and "Amazuppai Haru ni Sakura Saku", the latter recorded in collaboration with Cute. In total there are 10 tracks on the album.

There is also a Berryz Kobo version of "Seishun Gekijō", a track that has already been published on the compilation album Petit Best 12, performed there by the unit Berryz Kobo×Cute.

Ai no Album 8 will be available in 2 editions: regular (PKCP-5203) and limited (PKCP-5201/2). The limited edition comes with a DVD that includes a live performance of the group's upcoming single "Be Genki <Naseba Naru!>" and the album jacket making-of.

The album debuted at number 10 in the Oricon Daily Albums Chart and ranked 25th for the week.

Track listing 

Notes
 Tracks 2–8 were recorded live during the Hello! Project 2012 WINTER Hello Pro Tengoku ~Rock-chan~ concert tour at the Nakano Sun Plaza

Charts

References

External links 
 Profile on the Up-Front Works website 
 Profile on the Hello! Project website 
 First Press Limited Edition, profile on the Oricon website 
 Regular Edition, profile on the Oricon website 

2012 albums
Berryz Kobo albums